Aprosphylosoma darceneae is a species of cylindrical julidan millipede found only in the U.S. state of Oregon and comprising the sole species of the family Aprosphylosomatidae. The first pair of legs are extremely reduced into non-jointed, peg-like structures. The body color is yellowish brown with darker brown mottling on the dorsal surface, and the legs are white.

Aprosphylosoma was originally classified as a new distinct subfamily ("Aprosphylosomatinae") of the family Nemasomatidae. Subsequent cladistic analysis placed Aprosphylosoma into the family Paeromopodidae. Further taxonomic study elevated the genus to its own distinct family, Aprosphylosomatidae, which together with Paeromopodidae constitutes the superfamily Paeromopodoidea.

References

Julida
Millipedes of North America
Endemic fauna of Oregon
Animals described in 1961
Monotypic arthropod genera